Platydoris carinata is a species of sea slug, a dorid nudibranch, shell-less marine opisthobranch gastropod mollusks in the family Discodorididae found in New Caledonia.

References

Discodorididae
Gastropods described in 1928